Malaysia is an active member of various international organisations, including the Commonwealth of Nations, the United Nations, the Organisation of Islamic Cooperation, and the Non-Aligned Movement. It has also in recent times been an active proponent of regional co-operation.

Foreign Policy 1957–1969

Malaysia has been a member of the Commonwealth since independence in 1957, when it entered into the Anglo-Malayan Defence Agreement (AMDA) with the United Kingdom whereby Britain guaranteed the defence of Malaya (and later Malaysia). The presence of British and other Commonwealth troops were crucial to Malaysia's security during the Malayan Emergency (1948–1960) and the Indonesian Confrontation (1962–1966), which was sparked by Malaya's merger with the British colonies of Singapore, Sarawak and North Borneo to form Malaysia in 1963.

The British defence guarantee ended following Britain's decision in 1967 to withdraw its forces east of Suez, and was replaced in 1971 with the Five Power Defence Arrangements (FPDA) by which Britain, Australia, New Zealand, Malaysia and Singapore agreed to co-operate in the area of defence, and to "consult" in the event of external aggression or the threat of attack on Malaysia or Singapore. The FPDA continues to operate, and the Five Powers have a permanent Integrated Area Defence System based at RMAF Butterworth, and organise annual naval and air exercises.

Under the leadership of Prime Minister Tunku Abdul Rahman (up to 1970), Malaysia pursued a strongly pro-Commonwealth anti-communist foreign policy. Nonetheless, Malaysia was active in the opposition to apartheid that saw South Africa quit the Commonwealth in 1961, and was a founding member of the Association of Southeast Asian Nations (ASEAN) in 1967 and the Organisation of the Islamic Conference (OIC) in 1969, with the Tunku as its first Secretary-General in 1971.

Foreign policy since 1969

Under Prime Ministers Tun Abdul Razak and Tun Hussein Onn, Malaysia shifted its policy towards non-alignment and neutrality. Malaysia's foreign policy is officially based on the principle of neutrality and maintaining peaceful relations with all countries, regardless of their ideology or political system, and to further develop relations with other countries in the region. In 1971, ASEAN issued its neutralist and anti-nuclear Zone of Peace, Freedom and Neutrality (ZOPFAN) Declaration. In the same year, Malaysia joined the Non-Aligned Movement. Consistent with this policy Malaysia established diplomatic relations with the People's Republic of China in 1974.

This policy shift was continued and strengthened by Prime Minister Mahathir bin Mohamad, who pursued a regionalist and pro-South policy with at times strident anti-Western rhetoric. He long sought to establish an East Asian Economic Group as an alternative to APEC, excluding Australia, New Zealand and the Americas, and during his premiership Malaysia signed up to an ASEAN Free Trade Area (AFTA) and ASEAN+3, a regional forum with China, Japan and South Korea.

A strong tenet of Malaysia's policy is national sovereignty and the right of a country to control its domestic affairs.
Malaysia views regional co-operation as the cornerstone of its foreign policy. It attaches a high priority to the security and stability of Southeast Asia, and has tried to strengthen relations with other Islamic states. Malaysia was a leading advocate of expanding ASEAN's membership to include Laos, Vietnam, and Burma, arguing that "constructive engagement" with these countries, especially Burma, will help bring political and economic changes. Malaysia is also a member of G-15 and G-77 economic groupings.

Despite Mahathir's frequently anti-Western rhetoric he worked closely with Western countries, and led a crackdown against Islamic fundamentalists after the 11 September attacks. Under his successor, Abdullah Badawi, relations with Western countries, particularly Australia, have improved. The current Minister of Foreign Affairs is Dato' Seri Hishamuddin Hussein, who assumed office on 10 March 2020. with Kamaruddin Jaafar was deputy minister.

Malaysia has never recognised Israel and has no diplomatic ties with it, with the country ever condemning the Israelis action during their raid over a Gaza humanitarian mission and request the International Criminal Court to take any action against them. Malaysia has stated it will only establish an official relations with Israel once a peace agreement with the State of Palestine been reached and called for both parties to find a quick resolution. Malaysian peacekeeping forces have contributed to many UN peacekeeping missions, such as in Namibia, Cambodia, Bosnia and Herzegovina, Somalia, East Timor and Lebanon.

International affiliations

Malaysia is a founding member of the Association of Southeast Asian Nations (ASEAN) and the Organisation of the Islamic Conference (now the Organisation of Islamic Cooperation). It is also a member of the Non-Aligned Movement. Kuala Lumpur was the site of the first East Asia Summit in 2005, and Malaysia has chaired ASEAN, the OIC, and the NAM in the past. A former British colony, it is also a member of the Commonwealth.

Malaysia is affiliated with the United Nations and many of its specialised agencies, including UNESCO, World Bank, International Monetary Fund, International Atomic Energy Agency; General Agreement on Tariffs and Trade. It is also a member of the Asia-Pacific Economic Cooperation, the Developing 8 Countries. Asian Development Bank, Five-Power Defense Arrangement, G-77, and South Centre. On 31 October 2011 Malaysia became a party to the Antarctic Treaty.

International disputes

The policy towards territorial disputes by the Malaysian government is one of pragmatism, solving disputes in a number of ways, including some resolved in the International Court of Justice.

Spratly and other islands in the South China Sea

Malaysia has asserted sovereignty over the Spratly Islands together with China, the Philippines, Taiwan, Vietnam, and Brunei. Tensions have eased since the 2002 "Declaration on the Conduct of Parties in the South China Sea". However, it is not the legally binding code of conduct sought by some parties. Malaysia was not party to a March 2005 joint accord among the national oil companies of China, the Philippines and Vietnam on conducting marine seismic activities in the Spratly Islands. Malaysia long maintained a low-key approach to the dispute, maintaining positive relations with China due to strong economic ties, a large ethnic Chinese population, and a desire for a balance of power in the region. However, as Chinese fishing vessels and coast guard ships have become increasingly assertive, Malaysia has increased its diplomatic and military responses.

Ligitan, Sipadan and Ambalat

The ICJ awarded Ligitan and Sipadan islands to Malaysia over Indonesia but left the maritime boundary in the hydrocarbon-rich Celebes Sea in dispute, culminating in hostile confrontations in March 2005 over concessions to the Ambalat oil block.

Singapore

Singapore was a part of Malaysia for two years (1963–65), but it ultimately was asked by Tunku to secede after increased racial tensions due to the election campaigns in 1964. Today, disputes continue among other things, over the pricing of deliveries of raw untreated water to Singapore, Singapore's land reclamation causing a negative environmental impact in Malaysian waters, a new bridge to replace the Johor-Singapore Causeway which Singapore does not want to pay for, maritime boundaries, the redevelopment of Malayan Railway lands in Singapore and Pedra Branca. Both parties however, agreed to ICJ arbitration on the island dispute. On 24 May 2008, the International Court of Justice ruled that Pedra Branca belonged to Singapore with the nearby Middle Rocks going to Malaysia. Regarding railway land in Singapore, see also Malaysia-Singapore Points of Agreement of 1990. On introducing budget flights between Singapore and Kuala Lumpur, the stumbling block appears to be Malaysia's sympathy towards flag carrier Malaysia Airlines, and preference for the existing near duopoly with Singapore Airlines.

The Philippines

The Philippines has a dormant claim to eastern Sabah.

Brunei

Malaysia's land boundary with Brunei around Limbang is no longer in dispute. On 16 March 2009, Brunei announced its decision to drop a long-standing claim to Sarawak's Limbang district. This was the result of the two countries resolving their various land and sea territorial disputes. This issue was resolved along with several other disputes with the sealing and signing of letters of exchange by Abdullah and the Sultan Hassanal Bolkiah of Brunei at Istana Nurul Iman. As of 2010, the two countries are working towards resolving disputes over their maritime boundaries.

Thailand

According to a source, the areas around Ko Kra and Ko Losin in present-day Thailand are once disputed with Malaysia.

Bilateral relations

ASEAN

East Asia

Middle East

South Asia

Other parts of Asia

Europe

Americas

Oceania

Africa

Malaysia and the Commonwealth of Nations

The Federation of Malaya became an independent native elective monarchy within the Commonwealth on 31 August 1957 with the Yang di-Pertuan Agong as head of state.

Malaya united with North Borneo (now Sabah), Sarawak, and Singapore to form Malaysia on 16 September 1963.

Singapore was expelled from Malaysia on 9 August 1965, and became an independent republic in the Commonwealth of Nations.

See also

 List of diplomatic missions in Malaysia
 List of diplomatic missions of Malaysia
 Visa requirements for Malaysian citizens
 List of Ambassadors and High Commissioners to Malaysia
 List of Ambassadors and High Commissioners of Malaysia

External links
 Malaysia Ministry of Foreign Affairs

References

 
Malaysia and the Commonwealth of Nations
Political history of Malaysia